The West Indies cricket team toured Australia in the 1968-69 season and played a five-match Test series against Australia. Australia won the series 3-1 with one match drawn.

Test series summary

First Test

Third Test

Fourth Test

Fifth Test

External sources
 CricketArchive – tour summaries

Annual reviews
 Playfair Cricket Annual 1969
 Wisden Cricketers' Almanack 1970

References

Further reading
 Bill Frindall, The Wisden Book of Test Cricket 1877-1978, Wisden, 1979
 Chris Harte, A History of Australian Cricket, Andre Deutsch, 1993
 Ray Robinson, On Top Down Under, Cassell, 1975
 Phil Tresidder, Captains on a See-saw: The West Indies Tour of Australia, 1968-69, Souvenir, 1969 
 R.S. Whitington, Fours Galore: The West Indians and Their Tour of Australia, 1968-69, Cassell, 1969

1968 in Australian cricket
1968 in West Indian cricket
1969 in Australian cricket
1969 in West Indian cricket
Australian cricket seasons from 1945–46 to 1969–70
International cricket competitions from 1960–61 to 1970
1968-69